Asadabad (also Romanized as Asadābād; also known as Hasadābād) is a village in Neh Rural District, in the Central District of Nehbandan County, South Khorasan Province, Iran. At the 2006 census, its population was 823, in 179 families.

References 

Populated places in Nehbandan County